Jacek Soliński  (born 1957) is a Polish painter, photographer, publicist and publisher. He was born in Bydgoszcz. Since 1979, together with Jan Kaja, he has run an art gallery called Authors’ Gallery (org. Galeria Autorska) in Bydgoszcz. He is a Member of ZPAP Association of Polish Artists and Designers. In 2015 he received from Ministry of Culture and National Heritage (Poland) special medal for his contribution to Polish culture.

Information
In 1980s carried out conceptual projects and published on his own three books and five books of poems in linoleum print technique. Together with Jan Kaja elaborated and issued a number of monographic art books dedicated to fine artists.

Presented several dozen of solo exhibitions (in Poland: Bydgoszcz, Gdańsk, Sopot, Toruń, Warszawa, Łódź, Kraków, Lublin; and abroad in: Paris, Rome, Tokyo and Edinburgh).

Since 1986 carries out his annual birthday exhibition of linocuts in the Authors’ Gallery. Issued dozen or so of his own publications linking series of linocuts with epigrams, prayers, poetry and prose. Made many cycles of linocuts and a cycle of paintings of 366 angels entitled ″Guardians of time″.

Linocut (selection)

Paintings ("Guardians of time" - (selection))

Bibliography
"Chwile obecności (1979-2004)" Publisher: Galeria Autorska,  Bydgoszcz, 2004,

See also
 List of Polish painters

References

External links
  - official website of Galeria Autorska
  - biography on the website of Galeria Autorska
  - exhibition in Poland
   - information about artist in portal Bydgoszcz24
  - information about exhibition in Rome

Polish contemporary artists
Polish painters
Polish male painters
1957 births
Artists from Bydgoszcz
Living people